Rognosa di Sestriere is a mountain of the Cottian Alps in Piedmont, Italy.

Features 
The mountain lies near the village of Sestriere, from where it can be climbed with relative ease for anyone with mountain experience. From its summit the panorama takes in Mont Blanc, Gran Paradiso, the Dauphiné Alps, Monte Viso and the Col d'Izoard.

References 

Mountains of the Alps
Alpine three-thousanders
Mountains of Piedmont